Corinne Imlig (born 7 September 1979) is a Swiss former alpine skier.

In 2003, she competed in the Women's World Cup.

References

External links
 

1979 births
Living people
Swiss female alpine skiers
Place of birth missing (living people)